Dance History is the second compilation album by hip-hop duo The Outhere Brothers, following the 2002 compilation album The Fucking Hits.

Track listing
"Don't Stop (Wiggle Wiggle)"
"Boom Boom Boom"
"La La La (Hey Hey)"
"Mami Te Quiero" (featuring Gerardo)
"Bring That Ass Over Here"
"Fuk U"
"I Got Soul"
"I Want My Shit Back"
"Pass the Toilet Paper"
"Ohb Theme Song"
"Fuk U in the Ass"
"De Da De Da De"
"Ole Ole"
"Phat Phat Phat"
"Na Na Na Na"
"Boom Boom Boom" (Remix)

2005 compilation albums
The Outhere Brothers compilation albums
Eurodance albums